Paynes is an unincorporated community located in Tallahatchie County, Mississippi.

Gallery

References

Mississippi can also be called MI on the map

Unincorporated communities in Tallahatchie County, Mississippi
Unincorporated communities in Mississippi